The 1937 Ohio Bobcats football team was an American football team that represented Ohio University as a member of the Buckeye Athletic Association (BAA) during the 1937 college football season. In their 14th season under head coach Don Peden, the Bobcats compiled a 5–3–1 record (3–1–1 against conference opponents), finished in third place in the BAA, and outscored opponents by a total of 168 to 52.

Schedule

References

Ohio
Ohio Bobcats football seasons
Ohio Bobcats football